The year 1967 was an important one for psychedelic rock, and was famous for its "Summer of Love" in San Francisco. It saw major releases from The Beatles (Sgt. Pepper's Lonely Hearts Club Band and Magical Mystery Tour), Small Faces ("Itchycoo Park"), Eric Burdon & The Animals (Winds of Change), Big Brother and The Holding Company (Big Brother and The Holding Company), The Doors (The Doors and Strange Days), Jefferson Airplane (Surrealistic Pillow and After Bathing at Baxter's), Moby Grape (Moby Grape), Traffic (Mr. Fantasy), Pink Floyd (The Piper at the Gates of Dawn), Love (Forever Changes), The Beach Boys (Smiley Smile), Cream (Disraeli Gears), The Byrds (Younger Than Yesterday), The Rolling Stones (Between the Buttons and Their Satanic Majesties Request), The Who (The Who Sell Out), The Velvet Underground (The Velvet Underground & Nico), Procol Harum (Procol Harum), The Monkees (Headquarters and  Pisces, Aquarius, Capricorn & Jones Ltd.), and The Jimi Hendrix Experience (Are You Experienced? and Axis: Bold As Love).


Specific locations
1967 in British music
1967 in Norwegian music

Specific genres
1967 in country music
1967 in jazz

Events
 January 4 – The Doors release their debut album, The Doors
 January 8 – Elvis Presley turns 32.
 January 13 – Stephen Foster Memorial Day is observed for the first time in the United States (on the 103rd anniversary of the composer's death).
 January 14 – The Human Be-In takes place in San Francisco's Golden Gate Park Polo Fields with spoken words from Timothy Leary, Allen Ginsberg, Gary Snyder and others. Live music was provided by Jefferson Airplane, The Grateful Dead, Big Brother and the Holding Company and Quicksilver Messenger Service. Speeches from Jerry Rubin and others was also given at the event.
 January 15 – The Rolling Stones appear on The Ed Sullivan Show. At Ed Sullivan's request, the band change the lyrics of "Let's Spend the Night Together" to "Let's spend some time together".
 January 16 – The Monkees begin work on Headquarters, the first album to give them complete artistic and technical control over their material.
 January 17 – The Daily Mail newspaper reports 4,000 potholes in Blackburn, Lancashire; and Guinness heir Tara Browne is killed in a car wreck. These articles inspire lyrics for The Beatles song "A Day in the Life".
 January 22 – Simon & Garfunkel give live concert at Philharmonic Hall in New York City. Some of this concert is released on October 4, 1997, on their box set Old Friends, but most is not released until July 2002.
 January 29 – Mantra-Rock Dance, the "ultimate high" of the hippie era, is organised at The Avalon ballroom in San Francisco, featuring Janis Joplin, Grateful Dead, Big Brother and the Holding Company, Moby Grape, beat poet Allen Ginsberg and A. C. Bhaktivedanta Swami Prabhupada in support of the International Society for Krishna Consciousness.
 January 30 – The Beatles shoot a promotional film for their forthcoming single "Strawberry Fields Forever" at Knole Park in Sevenoaks.
 February 3 – UK record producer Joe Meek murders his landlady and then commits suicide by shooting himself in the head at Holloway, North London.
 February 6 – Michael Nesmith and Micky Dolenz of the Monkees fly into London. Dolenz sees Till Death Us Do Part on British TV and uses the term "Randy Scouse Git" from the programme for the title of The Monkees' next single release "Randy Scouse Git", not realising it is an offensive term. British censors force the title to be changed to "Alternate Title" in the UK.
 February 7 – Micky Dolenz meets Paul McCartney at his home in St John's Wood, London, and they pose together for the press. His impressions of the visit feature in the lyrics of "Randy Scouse Git".
 February 10 – Abbey Road Studio 2 session with Michael Nesmith in attendance as The Beatles record "A Day in the Life" with the London Philharmonic Orchestra performing an "orgasm of noise" featured twice in the song.
 February 12 – British police raid 'Redlands', the Sussex home of Keith Richards in the early hours of the morning following a tip-off about a party from the News of the World; although no arrests are made at the time, Richards, Mick Jagger and art dealer Robert Fraser are subsequently charged with possession of drugs.
 February 14 – Aretha Franklin records "Respect" at the New York based Atlantic Studios.
 February 16 – "Aretha Franklin Day" is declared in Detroit, Michigan.
 February 24 – The Bee Gees sign a management contract with Robert Stigwood.
 March 2 – The 9th Annual Grammy Awards are held in Los Angeles, hosted by Kirk Douglas. Frank Sinatra wins the most awards with five, including Album of the Year for A Man and His Music and Record of the Year for "Strangers in the Night". The Beatles win Song of the Year for "Michelle".
 March 3 – Eric Burdon & The Animals refuse to perform a show in Ottawa, Ontario, unless they are paid in advance. The audience of 3000 riots, causing $5000 in damages to the auditorium.
 March 11 – A taped appearance by The Beatles on American Bandstand includes their new music video for the songs "Penny Lane" and "Strawberry Fields Forever"
 March 25 – The Who perform their first concert in the United States, in New York.
 March 27 – John Lennon and Paul McCartney are awarded the Ivor Novello award for "Michelle", the most performed song in Britain in 1966.
 March 30 – The Beatles pose with a photographic collage and wax figures from Madame Tussaud's famous museum for the cover artwork of Sgt. Pepper's Lonely Hearts Club Band album at Chelsea Manor Studios in London.
 March 31 – Kicking off a tour with The Walker Brothers, Cat Stevens and Engelbert Humperdinck at The Astoria London, Jimi Hendrix sets fire to his guitar on stage for the first time. He is taken to hospital suffering burns to his hands. The guitar-burning act would later become a trademark of Hendrix's performances.
 April 8 – The 12th Eurovision Song Contest is held in the Hofburg Imperial Palace, Vienna, Austria. The United Kingdom wins the contest for the first time with the Bill Martin/Phil Coulter song "Puppet on a String", sung by Sandie Shaw.
 May 1 
 Paul McCartney reveals that all four members of the Beatles have "dropped acid".
 Elvis Presley marries Priscilla Beaulieu at the Aladdin, Las Vegas.
 May 2 – In the United States, Capitol Records pulls the plug on the Beach Boys' mysterious Smile project. Brian Wilson, who has taken more than a year to compose and produce the album, cannot bring himself to finish it.
 May 12
 Pink Floyd stage the first ever rock concert with quadraphonic sound at Queen Elizabeth Hall ("Games for May"). 
 The debut album of The Jimi Hendrix Experience, Are You Experienced, is released in the UK.
 May 15 – Paul McCartney meets American photographer Linda Eastman at a club called "Bag O' Nails".
 May 19 – Linda Eastman photographs The Beatles at the London press party for Sgt. Pepper's Lonely Hearts Club Band held at the Chapel Street home of Brian Epstein. Media present are perplexed by the band's fashion statements and the music itself.
 May 26 – Sgt. Pepper's Lonely Hearts Club Band by The Beatles is rush released in the UK as mono and stereo LPs ahead of the scheduled June 1 release date. "The closest Western Civilization has come to unity since the Congress of Vienna in 1815 was the week the Sgt. Pepper album was released."
 May 30 – BBC Radio broadcasts "Where It's At" featuring The Beatles interviews, and John Lennon's comedy intro to "Lucy in the Sky with Diamonds". BBC refuse to air "A Day in the Life" for alleged "drug references" in the lyrics.
 June 1 – Greece's fascist junta issues "Army decree No 13", which bans playing or listening to the music of Mikis Theodorakis.
 June 4 – Jimi Hendrix Experience, Cream, Denny Laine and his Electric String Band, Procol Harum and The Chiffons perform a two-hour "Sunday Special" at the Saville Theatre in London.
 June 10–11 – The KFRC Fantasy Fair and Magic Mountain Music Festival at Mount Tamalpais in Marin County, California features Canned Heat, The Byrds, The Seeds, Blues Magoos, Jefferson Airplane, The Doors, Country Joe and the Fish and others on the bill for a charity concert attended by 20,000-40,000; considered America's first pop festival, but eclipsed in stature by the Monterey Pop Festival the following week.
 June 15 – Jacqueline Du Pré marries Daniel Barenboim at the Western Wall in Jerusalem.
 June 16 – Barbra Streisand performs live concert "A Happening in Central Park" in New York's Central Park.
 June 16–18 – The Monterey Pop Festival, one of the world's first outdoor rock music festivals, is held in Monterey, California. Stars include The Who, Simon and Garfunkel, Eric Burdon & The Animals, The Byrds, The Association, Jefferson Airplane, Big Brother and The Holding Company w/ Janis Joplin, and Jimi Hendrix. Otis and the MG's take the stage at 1:00 am after Jefferson Airplane and bring down the house; 55,000 are estimated to be in attendance. Ravi Shankar is among the performers at the festival.
 June 19 – During his stay in California on a houseboat in Sausalito, while listening to the Beatles' Sgt Pepper Lonely Hearts Club Band, Otis Redding is inspired to compose "The Dock of the Bay".
 June 25 – The Beatles debut "All You Need Is Love" to close the Our World television special from London, the first worldwide television broadcast, seen live by an audience of over 400 million in 25 countries. Backing singers include Eric Clapton, members of The Rolling Stones and The Who.
 June 28
 The Supremes perform for the first time as Diana Ross & the Supremes at the Flamingo Hotel in Las Vegas. Florence Ballard is fired from the group after the first night, and on-hand stand-in Cindy Birdsong permanently takes Ballard's place in the group.
 The Monkees fly into London at the start of their concerts at the Empire Pool, Wembley.
 June 29 – Mick Jagger and Keith Richards are sentenced to jail for drug possession. They later appeal successfully against the sentences.
 June–July – Shortly after the end of the Six-Day War, conductor Leonard Bernstein leads the Israel Philharmonic Orchestra on a tour to the Sinai desert, the site of fighting only days before.
 July 1 – William Rees-Mogg, editor of The Times (London), uses the phrase "Who breaks a butterfly upon a wheel?" in his editorial criticizing the prison sentences given to Mick Jagger and Keith Richard two days earlier.
 July 2 – Jeff Beck and John Mayall & the Bluesbreakers perform a two-hour "Sunday Special" at the Saville Theatre in London.
 July 3 – The Beatles host a party at The Speakeasy Club for The Monkees on the completion of their concerts in London.
 July 5 – First of the Schaefer Music Festivals, held in Central Park, New York City. The lineup consists of Len Chandler, The Young Rascals and The Jimi Hendrix Experience.  
 July 18 – The Jimi Hendrix Experience is thrown off a tour of The Monkees after complaints from the conservative Daughters of the American Revolution. (Hendrix's manager Chas Chandler later admits it was a publicity stunt.)
 July 29 – Motown Records releases "Reflections," the first single by the group's new billing, "Diana Ross & The Supremes" and after firing founding member Florence Ballard; Ballard, nevertheless, sings on the record and appears on the vinyl's cover alongside group members Ross and Wilson because the song was recorded before her dismissal.
 August 5 – Pink Floyd releases their debut album, The Piper at the Gates of Dawn. It peaked at number 6 on the UK Albums Chart and is the only one made under the leadership of founder Syd Barrett.
 August 14 – The Marine Broadcasting Offences Act becomes law in the United Kingdom, and most offshore radio stations (including Wonderful Radio London) have already closed down. Only Radio Caroline North & South on 259 would continue. As Radio Caroline International.
 August 21 – Mikis Theodorakis is arrested by the Greek military authorities and jailed for five months.
 August 23 – Brian Epstein's last visit to a Beatles' recording session, at the Chappell Recording Studios on Maddox Street, London. The last new Beatles song he lived to hear was "Your Mother Should Know". Epstein died of an overdose of Carbitral, a form of barbiturate or sleeping pill, in his locked bedroom, on 27 August 1967
 August 27 – The Beatles, in Bangor, Wales, with the Maharishi Mahesh Yogi since August 25, are informed of the death of their manager Brian Epstein, and they return to London at once.
 August 31 – Paul McCartney calls a band meeting to discuss his TV movie idea about a psychedelic bus ride.
 September 7 – Eric Burdon marries Angie King.
 September 16 – Too ill to conduct, after undergoing surgery for pancreatic cancer, Sir Malcolm Sargent makes a valedictory appearance at the Last Night of the Proms.
 September 17
 The Doors appear on The Ed Sullivan Show and perform "Light My Fire". Despite having agreed to Sullivan's request that the line "Girl we couldn't get much higher" be changed for the show, Jim Morrison performs it the way it was written and The Doors are banned from the show.
 The Who destroy their instruments during a performance on The Smothers Brothers Comedy Hour.  Keith Moon's exploding drum kit injures Pete Townshend.
 September 29 – Tangerine Dream is founded by Edgar Froese in West-Berlin.
 September 30 – The BBC replaces the Home Service with a pop music programme, Radio 1, and changes the Light Programme into the more MOR-orientated Radio 2, also launching the all-news Radio 4. The Third Programme is unchanged.
 October 14 – Tammi Terrell faints and collapses into duet partner Marvin Gaye's arms onstage during a performance at the Hampton University homecoming in Virginia. She is later diagnosed with a brain tumor, and will die from brain cancer in 1970 at the age of 24.
 October 18 – The first issue of Rolling Stone rolls off the press at about 5:30pm, with a cover dated November 9 and featuring a photo of John Lennon in the film How I Won the War. The original inspiration for the magazine was Bomp! magazine based in California, which preceded the existence of Rolling Stone.
 October 27 – Sir Malcolm Sargent's memorial service is attended by 3,000 people including Princess Marina of Kent, Bridget D'Oyly Carte, Pierre Boulez, Larry Adler, Douglas Fairbanks Junior, Léon Goossens, Sir Arthur Bliss, and representatives of the London orchestras and of the Promenaders. Colin Davis and the BBC Chorus and Symphony Orchestra performed the music.
 November 22
 Oricon is founded in Japan by Sōkō Koike and begins publishing a singles chart.
 Otis Redding records "(Sittin' On) The Dock of the Bay" at Stax Records' studio in Memphis, Tennessee.
 December 5 
 George Harrison begins recording tracks for Wonderwall Music, his first solo album, in London; he continues the recording in Mumbai.
 The Beatles open the Apple Boutique in London. Party guests include Eric Clapton and movie director Richard Lester.
 December 7 – Otis Redding records overdubs to "(Sittin' On) The Dock of the Bay".
 December 8 – Otis Redding and his backup band, Bar-Kays, play at a popular nightclub, Leo's Casino in Cleveland, Ohio. This is to be Redding's last performance. Two days later he and four of the six Bar-Kays are among the six people who die when a Beechcraft Model 18 plane in which they are traveling crashes in Lake Monona, Madison, Wisconsin, one of the worst air tragedies in entertainment history, and the worst since "The Day the Music Died" when Buddy Holly, Ritchie Valens and The Big Bopper died in a crash in 1959.
 December 9 – During a performance at the New Haven Arena in New Haven, Connecticut, Jim Morrison of The Doors becomes the first singer to be arrested on stage, having earlier been sprayed with a can of mace. He was charged with inciting a riot, indecency and public obscenity. The charges are dropped several weeks later due to a lack of evidence.
 December 15 – The Who release their third studio album, The Who Sell Out. It is a concept album, formatted as a collection of unrelated songs interspersed with faux commercials and public service announcements.
 December 26 – First telecast of The Beatles' Magical Mystery Tour on BBC1 in the UK. Shown in black and white, it upsets McCartney because it ruins the intended psychedelic color effects.
date unknown
 Pickwick Records releases LP collection of ten 1950s A- and B-sides of singles by Simon & Garfunkel, recorded under their pseudonym Tom & Jerry, and tries to pass it off as current material by the duo. Simon and Garfunkel file a legal challenge, and the record is swiftly withdrawn from the market.
 Toots & the Maytals releases "54-46 That's My Number", one of the first reggae songs.
 The Savonlinna Opera Festival is re-launched in Savonlinna, Finland, after a gap of fifty years.
 The first LP recording of traditional Estonian music, Eesti rahvalaule ja pillilugusid, is released.
 The International Society of Bassists is founded by Gary Karr.
 Ali Akbar Khan founds a school of music in California.

Musical groups formed
 See :Category:Musical groups established in 1967

Musical groups disbanded
 The Crystals
 Johnny Kidd & The Pirates
 Orchestre de la Société des Concerts du Conservatoire
 The Rooftop Singers
 The Tornados
 The Trashmen

Albums released

January

February

March

April

May

June

July

August

September

October

November

December

Release date unknown

 Alligator Bogaloo - Lou Donaldson
 And We Were Lovers – Shirley Bassey 
 Another Story - Ernest Tubb
 Anything Goes! The Dave Brubeck Quartet Plays Cole Porter - Dave Brubeck
 Back Up Train – Al Green
 Backlash - Freddie Hubbard
 A Bag Full of Blues - Jimmy McGriff
 Ballads from Deep Gap - Doc Watson and Merle Watson
 Basie's Beat - Count Basie Orchestra
 Beach Samba - Astrud Gilberto
 The Beat of Brazil – Sergio Mendes & Brasil '66
 The Beat Goes On - Herbie Mann
 The Best of Ronnie Dove Volume 2 – Ronnie Dove
 Blaze – Herman's Hermits
 The Blues Alone – John Mayall
 Blue Benson – George Benson
 Blues Is King – B. B. King
 Blue Notes - Johnny Hodges
 Bobby Darin Sings Doctor Dolittle - Bobby Darin
 Bobo Motion - Willie Bobo
 Booker 'n' Brass - Booker Ervin
 'Bout Changes 'n' Things Take 2 - Eric Andersen
 Browns Sing the Big Ones from Country - The Browns
 Bucket o' Grease - Les McCann Ltd.
 Burning Bridges - Glen Campbell
 By the Time I Get to Phoenix - Glen Campbell
 California Nights - Lesley Gore
 Call of the Valley – Hariprasad Chaurasia, Brij Bhushan Kabra and Shivkumar Sharma
 Carryin' On with Johnny Cash & June Carter - Johnny Cash and June Carter Cash
 Cauldron – Fifty Foot Hose
 Casino Royale – Burt Bacharach 
 Cellophane – The Troggs
 Cherry Red - Eddie Vinson
 Chet - Chet Atkins
 Chicken Fat - Mel Brown
 Chocomotive - Houston Person
 Christmas with Anita Bryant – Anita Bryant
 Chuck Berry's Golden Hits - Chuck Berry
 Clear Light – Clear Light
 Cliff in Japan – Cliff Richard
 The Cold Hard Facts of Life - Porter Wagoner
 Colour My World – Petula Clark
 Connie in the Country - Connie Smith
 Connie Smith Sings Bill Anderson - Connie Smith
 Conquistador! – Cecil Taylor
 Contours - Sam Rivers
 The Country Way - Charley Pride
 Creole Cookin' - Bobby Hackett
 Cry (Ronnie Dove album) – Ronnie Dove
 Daktari - Shelly Manne
 Dave Van Ronk and the Hudson Dusters - Dave Van Ronk
 A Day in the Life – Wes Montgomery
 Days Have Gone By - John Fahey
 Doktor Dolittle – Fred Åkerström 
 Double Dynamite – Sam & Dave
 A Drop of the Hard Stuff – The Dubliners
 Earthwords & Music - John Hartford
 Ella and Duke at the Cote D'Azur – Ella Fitzgerald and Duke Ellington
 Emotions – The Pretty Things
 Evil – Howlin' Wolf
 Extra Special! – Peggy Lee
 The Far East Suite – Duke Ellington
 Feelin' Groovy – Harper's Bizarre
The First Edition – Kenny Rogers and the First Edition 
 For All the Seasons of Your Mind – Janis Ian
 From Sergio – With Love – Sergio Franchi
 Future – The Seeds
 Gene Clark with the Gosdin Brothers – Gene Clark
 H. P. Lovecraft – H. P. Lovecraft
 High Priestess of Soul – Nina Simone
 Hour Glass – Hour Glass
 I Think We're Alone Now – Tommy James and the Shondells
 Incense and Peppermints – Strawberry Alarm Clock
 Inner Views – Sonny Bono
 Introducing the Sonics – The Sonics
 Juicy – Willie Bobo
 Just for You – Neil Diamond 
 Knock on Wood – Eddie Floyd
 The Last Waltz – Engelbert Humperdick
 The Letter/Neon Rainbow – The Box Tops
 Live! At Caesar's Palace – Checkmates, Ltd.
 Live at the Fillmore Auditorium – Chuck Berry
 Looks at Life - John Hartford
 Ludo – Ivor Cutler Trio
 The Marvelettes – The Marvelettes
 Mixed Bag – Richie Havens
 More of the Hard Stuff – The Dubliners
 Morning Dew – Tim Rose
 Nice Girls Don't Stay for Breakfast – Julie London
 The Nitty Gritty Dirt Band – Nitty Gritty Dirt Band
 No Way Out – The Chocolate Watchband
 The Original Spinners – The Spinners
Out of Different Bags - Marlena Shaw
 The Parable of Arable Land – The Red Crayola
 The Party's Over and Other Great Willie Nelson Songs – Willie Nelson
 Ptooff! – The Deviants
 Reach Out – Burt Bacharach
 The Real McCoy – McCoy Tyner
 Reflections – Terry Knight and the Pack
 Release Me – Engelbert Humperdinck
 Revolution! – Paul Revere & the Raiders
 Ricochet – Nitty Gritty Dirt Band
 Safe As Milk -Captain Beefheart and his Magic Band
 Say Siegel-Schwall – Siegel-Schwall Band
 Seen in Green – The Seekers
 Shake Down – Savoy Brown
 Songs for Rainy Day Lovers – Clare Fischer
 The Story of Simon Simopath – Nirvana
 The Soul of a Bell – William Bell
 Straight, No Chaser – Thelonious Monk
 Strictly Instrumental – Lester Flatt, Earl Scruggs and Doc Watson
 Super Blues – Bo Diddley, Muddy Waters & Little Walter
 Supernatural Fairy Tales – Art
 The Super Super Blues Band – Bo Diddley, Muddy Waters & Howlin' Wolf
 These Are My Songs – Petula Clark
 There Goes My Heart – Sergio Franchi
 The Thoughts of Emerlist Davjack – The Nice
Today My Way - Patti Page
 The Trip – Electric Flag (Soundtrack)
 Víctor Jara – Víctor Jara
 Waist Deep in the Big Muddy – Pete Seeger
 Walk Through This World with Me – George Jones
 We Are Ever So Clean – Blossom Toes
 The West Coast Pop Art Experimental Band Part One – The West Coast Pop Art Experimental Band
 West Side Soul – Magic Sam
 Whisper Not – Ella Fitzgerald
 With Body & Soul – Julie London

Billboard Top popular records of 1967

The completed Billboard year-end list for 1967 is composed of records that entered the Billboard Hot 100 between November 1966 and December 1967. Records with chart runs that started in 1966 and ended in 1967, or started in 1967 and ended in 1968, made this chart if the majority of their chart weeks were in 1967. If not, they were ranked in the year-end charts for 1966 or 1968. If their weeks were equal, they were listed in the year they first entered. Appearing in multiple years is not permitted. Each week thirty points were awarded to the number one record, then nineteen points for number two, eighteen points for number three, and so on. The total points a record earned determined its year-end rank. The complete chart life of each record is represented, with number of points accrued. There are no ties, even when multiple records have the same number of points. The next ranking category is peak chart position, then weeks at peak chart position, weeks in top ten, weeks in top forty, and finally weeks on Hot 100 chart. 

The chart can be sorted by Artist, Song title, Recording and Release dates, Cashbox year-end ranking (CB) or units sold (sales) by clicking on the column header. Additional details for each record can be accessed by clicking on the song title, and referring to the Infobox in the right column of the song page. Billboard also has chart summaries on its website. Cashbox rankings were derived by same process as the Billboard rankings. Sales information was derived from the RIAA's Gold and Platinum database, the BRIT Certified database  and The Book of Golden Discs, but numbers listed should be regarded as estimates. Grammy Hall of Fame and National Recording Registry information with sources can be found on Wikipedia. Archived issues of Billboard from November 1966 to March 1968 and Hot 100 Year-End formulas were used to complete the 1967 year-end chart published December 30, 1967.

Top American hits on record
w. = words, m. = music

British number one hits not included above
 "Puppet on a String" – Sandie Shaw
 "Silence Is Golden" – The Tremeloes
 "The Last Waltz" – Engelbert Humperdinck
 "Massachusetts" – Bee Gees
 "Baby Now That I've Found You" – The Foundations
 "Let the Heartaches Begin" – Long John Baldry

Other significant singles

Published popular music
w. = words, m. = music
 "At the Crossroads" w.m. Leslie Bricusse, from the film Doctor Dolittle
 "The Bare Necessities" w.m. Terry Gilkyson from the film The Jungle Book
 "Blowin' Away" w.m. Laura Nyro
 "Bonnie and Clyde" w.m. Charles Strouse
 "Both Sides, Now" w.m. Joni Mitchell
 "By the Time I Get to Phoenix" w.m. Jimmy Webb
 "Colour My World" w.m. Jackie Trent & Tony Hatch
 "Do You Know The Way To San Jose?" w. Hal David m. Burt Bacharach
 "Even The Bad Times Are Good" w. Peter Callander  m. Mitch Murray
 "The Eyes Of Love" w. Bob Russell m. Quincy Jones
 "Fortuosity" w.m. Richard M. Sherman and Robert B. Sherman, introduced by Tommy Steele in the film The Happiest Millionaire
 "Gentle On My Mind" w.m. John Hartford
 "Happiness" w.m. Clark Gesner from the musical You're a Good Man, Charlie Brown
 "Hare Krishna"  w. Gerome Ragni & James Rado m. Galt MacDermot
 "I Wanna Be Like You" w.m. Richard M. Sherman and Robert B. Sherman, from the film The Jungle Book
 "I've Gotta Be Me" w.m. Walter Marks
 "In the Heat of the Night" w. Alan Bergman & Marilyn Bergman m. Quincy Jones.  Theme song from the film of the same name, performed by Ray Charles
 "The Look of Love" w. Hal David m. Burt Bacharach from the film Casino Royale, sung by Dusty Springfield
 "Mrs. Robinson" w.m. Paul Simon from the film The Graduate
 "My Friend, The Doctor" w.m. Leslie Bricusse from the film Doctor Dolittle
 "One Less Bell To Answer" w. Hal David m. Burt Bacharach
 "Springtime for Hitler" w.m. Mel Brooks, from the film The Producers
 "Puppet on a String" w.m. Bill Martin & Phil Coulter
 "Talk to the Animals" w.m. Leslie Bricusse. Introduced by Rex Harrison in the film Doctor Dolittle
 "The Tapioca" w. Sammy Cahn m. Jimmy Van Heusen Introduced by Jim Bryant dubbing for James Fox in the film Thoroughly Modern Millie
 "Thoroughly Modern Millie" w. Sammy Cahn m. Jimmy Van Heusen Introduced by Julie Andrews in the film Thoroughly Modern Millie
 "To Sir, with Love" w.m. Don Black & Mark London. Introduced by Lulu in the 1967 film To Sir, with Love
 "What a Wonderful World" w.m. Bob Thiele & George David Weiss
 "You Only Live Twice" w. Leslie Bricusse m. John Barry

Other notable songs
 "Alegria, Alegria" w.m. Caetano Veloso
 "Comme d'habitude" w. Claude François and Gilles Thibaut m. Claude François and Jacques Revaux
 "Déshabillez-moi" w. Robert Nyel m. Gaby Verlor
 "Nezhnost'" w. Nikolay Dobronravov and Sergey Grebennikov m. Alexandra Pakhmutova

Classical music
 Jean Absil – Concerto for Piano and Orchestra No. 2
 Malcolm Arnold – Symphony No. 6
 Luciano Berio
Chemins II for viola and nine instruments
O King for soprano and five instruments
Sequenza VI for viola
 Earle Brown – Event: Synergy II, for chamber ensemble
 Carlos Chávez – Soli IV, for horn, trumpet, and trombone
 George Crumb – Echoes of Time and the River (Echoes II) for orchestra
 Gottfried von Einem – Violin Concerto
 Benjamin Frankel – Viola Concerto
 Philip Glass – 600 Lines
 Milko Kelemen – Composé, for two pianos and orchestral group
 Wojciech Kilar – Solenne per 67 Esecutori, for solo voices and orchestra or instrumental ensemble
 Paul Lansky – String Quartet No. 1
 György Ligeti – Lontano
 Witold Lutosławski – Symphony No. 2
 Bruno Maderna – Concerto No. 2 for Oboe and Orchestra
 Henri Pousseur – Couleurs croisées for large orchestra
 María Teresa Prieto – Palo verde, ballet
 Steve Reich – Piano Phase
 Karlheinz Stockhausen –
 Hymnen
 Mixtur, version for small orchestra
 Prozession
 Toru Takemitsu – November Steps
 Veljo Tormis
 Eesti kalendrilaulud (Estonian Calendar Songs)
 Maarjamaa ballaad (Ballad of Mary's Land)
 Iannis Xenakis
Medea for male voices and 5 instruments
Polytope de Montréal
 Bernd Alois Zimmermann
 Intercomunicazione
 Tratto

Opera
 Yasushi Akutagawa – Orpheus of Hiroshima
 Richard Rodney Bennett – A Penny for a Song
 Cromwell Everson – Klutaimnestra (Eng: Clytemnestra) 
 Elizabeth Maconchy – The Three Strangers
 William Walton – The Bear

Jazz

Musical theater
 The Boy Friend (Sandy Wilson) – London revival opened at the Comedy Theatre on November 29 and ran for 365 performances
 By Jupiter (Music: Richard Rodgers Lyrics: Lorenz Hart Book: Rodgers and Hart). Off-Broadway revival opened at Theatre Four on January 19 and ran for 118 performances.
 Curley McDimple (Music & Lyrics: Robert Dahdah Book: Mary Boylan and Robert Dahdah). Off-Broadway production opened at the Bert Wheeler Theatre on November 22 and ran for 931 performances
 Fiddler on the Roof (Music: Jerry Bock Lyrics: Sheldon Harnick Book: Joseph Stein). London production opened at Her Majesty's Theatre on February 16 and ran for 2030 performances.
 The Four Musketeers, (Music: Laurie Johnson Lyrics: Herbert Kretzmer Book: Michael Pertwee). London production opened at the Drury Lane Theatre on December 5 and ran for 462 performances
 Hallelujah, Baby! – Broadway production opened at the Martin Beck Theatre and ran for 293 performances
 Henry, Sweet Henry – Broadway production opened at the Palace Theatre and ran for 80 performances
 How Now, Dow Jones – Broadway production opened at the Lunt-Fontanne Theatre and ran for 220 performances
 Oliver! (Music, Lyrics & Book: Lionel Bart) – London revival opened at the Piccadilly Theatre on April 26 and ran for 331 performances
 Sweet Charity (Music: Cy Coleman Lyrics: Dorothy Fields Book: Neil Simon). London production opened at the Prince of Wales Theatre on October 11 and ran for 476 performances.

Musical films
 Anna
 Camelot
 Doctor Dolittle, starring Rex Harrison, Samantha Eggar and Anthony Newley.  Directed by Richard Fleischer
 The Fastest Guitar Alive, starring Roy Orbison
 Half a Sixpence, starring Tommy Steele
 The Happiest Millionaire
 How to Succeed in Business Without Really Trying
 Les Demoiselles de Rochefort
 The Mikado
 Thoroughly Modern Millie, starring Julie Andrews and Mary Tyler Moore.
 Magical Mystery Tour, starring The Beatles

Births
 January 2 – Tia Carrere (Althea Rae Janairo), American actress and singer
 January 4 – Son of Dave (Benjamin Darvill), Canadian-born musician (Crash Test Dummies)
 January 5 - J. H. Wyman,  a film and TV producer, screenwriter, director and musician
 January 6 – A. R. Rahman (A. S. Dileep Kumar), Indian film composer
 January 8 — R. Kelly (Robert Sylvester Kelly), American singer-songwriter, record producer
 January 7 – Mark Lamarr (Mark Jones), English presenter of radio and TV music programmes
 January 9 
 Dave Matthews, American singer, songwriter, and guitarist
 Steve Harwell, American musician and singer (Smash Mouth) 
 January 14 – Steve Bowman, American rock drummer (Counting Crows)
 January 22 – Eleanor McEvoy, Irish singer-songwriter and guitarist
 January 25 – Voltaire (Aurelio Voltaire Hernández), Cuban-born cabaret musician
 January 28 – Marvin Sapp, American singer-songwriter 
 January 31
 Fat Mike (Michael Burkett), American rock singer and musician
 Chad Channing, American rock drummer (Nirvana and Child's Play )
 Jason Cooper, English drummer (The Cure and My Life Story)
 February 6 
 Anita Cochran, American singer-songwriter, guitarist and producer
 Izumi Sakai, Japanese pop singer (Zard) (d. 2007)
 February 11 
 Clay Crosse, American Christian musician
 Paul McLoone, Irish DJ, producer, voice actor and frontman/lead vocalist with The Undertones
 February 12 – Chitravina N. Ravikiran, Indian composer and musician
 February 17 – Chanté Moore, American singer
 February 19 – Sven Erik Kristiansen Norwegian Black metal and hardcore punk singer (Maniac)
 February 20 – Kurt Cobain, American singer-songwriter (Nirvana) (d. 1994)
 March 4 – Evan Dando American musician and frontman/lead vocalist (The Lemonheads)
 March 7
 Randy Guss, (Toad the Wet Sprocket)
 Ruthie Henshall, English actress, singer, and dancer; star of stage musicals
 March 11 – John Barrowman, British-American actor and singer
 March 17 – Billy Corgan American musician, songwriter, producer, poet (The Smashing Pumpkins)
 March 18 – Miki Berenyi, British rock lead singer
 March 21 – Jonas Berggren (Ace of Base)
 March 29 – John Popper (Blues Traveler)
 April 12 – Sarah Cracknell (Saint Etienne)
 April 14 – Barrett Martin, American drummer and composer
 April 15 – Frankie Poullain, British rock bassist (The Darkness)
 April 17 – Liz Phair, American singer-songwriter
 April 20 – Mike Portnoy, American rock drummer (Dream Theater)
 April 28 – Kari Wuhrer, American actress and singer
 April 30 – Filipp Kirkorov, Soviet and Russian pop singer, actor, producer, TV presenter
 May 1 – Tim McGraw, American country singer, producer, and actor
 May 6 – Mark Bryan American musician (Hootie & the Blowfish)
 May 11 – Apache Indian (real name Steven Kapur), British reggae singer and DJ
 May 13
 Chuck Schuldiner, American singer and guitarist (d. 2001)
 Melanie Thornton, American pop singer (d. 2001)
 May 18 – Rob Base, American rapper
 May 22 – MC Eiht, American rapper
 May 23 – Phil Selway (Radiohead)
 May 24 – Heavy D, Jamaican-born American rapper record producer, singer, and actor (d. 2011)
 May 29 – Noel Gallagher, English singer, songwriter and musician (Oasis)
 June 7 – Dave Navarro, American guitarist, singer, songwriter, and actor (guitarist (Jane's Addiction and Red Hot Chili Peppers)) 
 June 8 – Jasmin Tabatabai, Iranian-German actress and musician
 June 9 – Dean Felber, Hootie & the Blowfish
June 10 – Emma Anderson, English musician, singer-songwriter, guitarist, member of (Lush) 
 June 17 
Dorothea Röschmann, German soprano and actress 
Eric Stefani, American keyboard player, songwriter and animator (No Doubt)
 June 18 – Glen Benton, American rock singer/bassist (Deicide)
 June 20 
 Jerome Fontamillas, American singer and guitarist
 Nicole Kidman, Australian singer, musician, actress, and producer 
 June 24 
Jeff Cease, American guitarist (The Black Crowes)
Richard Kruspe German musician and guitarist (Rammstein)
 June 29
 Murray Foster, Canadian rock bassist (Moxy Früvous)
 Melora Hardin, American actress and singer
 John Feldmann, American musician and music producer
 July 7 – Jackie Neal, American blues singer (d. 2005)
 July 12 – John Petrucci, American virtuoso guitarist
July 13 – Benny Benassi, Italian DJ, record producer, and remixer
 July 17 – Susan Ashton, American singer
 July 19 – Stuart Howe, Canadian operatic tenor
 July 22 – Pat Badger American musician, singer, and songwriter (Extreme)
 July 27 – Juliana Hatfield, American singer-songwriter and musician
 July 28 – Taka Hirose, Japanese musician (Feeder)
 August 18 – Blas Elias, American drummer (Slaughter)
 August 21 – Serj Tankian Armenian-American singer, musician, songwriter, record producer, and political activist (System of a Down)
 August 22
 Yukiko Okada, Japanese pop singer (d. 1986)
 Layne Staley, American rock singer (Alice in Chains) (d. 2002)
 August 25 – Jeff Tweedy American musician, songwriter, author, and record producer (Wilco)
 August 27 – Ogie Alcasid, Filipino singer, television personality, and husband of Regine Velasquez
 August 29 – Anton Newcombe, American rock musician (The Brian Jonestown Massacre)
 September 2 – Dino Cazares, American rock guitarist (Divine Heresy', Fear Factory)
 September 5 – Jesper Koch, Danish composer
 September 9 – Chris Caffery, American guitarist and singer
 September 11 – Harry Connick, Jr., American jazz singer and pianist
 September 18 – Ricky Bell, American singer and actor (New Edition, Bell Biv DeVoe)
 September 20
 Gunnar Nelson, American singer
 Matthew Nelson, American singer
 September 21 – Faith Hill, American country singer and record producer 
 September 26 – Shannon Hoon, American singer (Blind Melon) (d. 1995)
 September 28 – Moon Unit Zappa, American actress and musician
 September 29 – Brett Anderson, Suede
 October 2 – Bud Gaugh American drummer (Sublime)
 October 4 – Ekin Cheng, Hong Kong actor and singer
 October 5 – Johnny Gioeli, American power metal singer
 October 7 – Toni Braxton, American singer, songwriter, pianist, record producer, actress, television personality, and philanthropist
 October 8 – Teddy Riley, American R&B and hip hop singer
 October 10 – Mike Malinin American musician (Goo Goo Dolls)
 October 17 – René Dif Danish musician, singer-songwriter, DJ and actor (Aqua)
 October 19 – Trouble T Roy, back-up singer for Heavy D & the Boyz (d. 1990)
 October 22 
 Salvatore Di Vittorio, Italian composer and conductor
 Rita Guerra, Portuguese singer-songwriter
 October 26 – Keith Urban,  New Zealand-Australian country music singer, songwriter, guitarist, musician, TV show judge, and record producer
 October 27 – Scott Weiland American singer and songwriter (Stone Temple Pilots) (d. 2015)
 October 29 – Péter Kun, Hungarian guitarist (d. 1993)
 October 31 – Adam Schlesinger American musician, singer, songwriter, composer, and record producer (Fountains of Wayne)
 November 1
 Sophie B. Hawkins, American singer-songwriter
 Tina Arena, Australian-French singer-songwriter
 November 3 – Steven Wilson, English progressive rockmusician
 November 5 – Kayah (Katarzyna Magdalena Szczot), Polish pop singer-songwriter
 November 7
 Steve Di Giorgio, American bassist
 Sharleen Spiteri, Scottish recording artist and songwriter (Texas)
 David Guetta,  French DJ and music producer
 November 14
 Letitia Dean, English actress and singer
 Nina Gordon, American singer
 November 15 – E-40, American rapper
 November 16 – Ronnie DeVoe American singer, rapper and actor (New Edition, Bell Biv DeVoe)
 November 19 – Lauren Christy, English singer-songwriter and record producer (member of The Matrix writing team) 
 November 20 – Teoman, Turkish rock singer-songwriter
 November 27 – Rodney Sheppard, American guitarist (Sugar Ray)
 December 5 –  Gary Allan, American country musician
 December 6 – Hacken Lee, Hong Kong singer and actor
December 8 – Tom Holkenborg, Dutch composer, multi-instrumentalist, DJ, music producer, and engineer.
 December 9 – Joshua Bell, American violinist
 December 12
Yuzo Koshiro, Japanese composer and producer
Takenobu Mitsuyoshi, Japanese composer and voice actor
Deke Sharon, American singer-songwriter and producer (The House Jacks and Beelzebubs)
December 13 – Jamie Foxx, American singer-songwriter, actor, producer, and comedian
 December 17 – Gigi D'Agostino, DJ
 December 25 – Jason Thirsk, Pennywise
 February 1 – Gábor Tarján, composer

Deaths
 January 1 – Moon Mullican, country singer, 57 (heart attack)
 January 3 – Mary Garden, operatic soprano, 93
 January 7 – Carl Schuricht, conductor, 86
 January 15 – Albert Szirmai, composer, 86
 January 27 – Luigi Tenco, singer-songwriter and actor, 28 (suicide by gunshot)
 January 31 – Geoffrey O'Hara, composer, 84
 February 5 – Violeta Parra, Chilean folk musician, 49 (suicide by gunshot)
 February 12 – Muggsy Spanier, jazz cornettist, 60
 February 15 – Li Jinhui, composer and songwriter, 75
 February 16 – Smiley Burnette, singer and songwriter, 55 (leukaemia)
 February 24 – Franz Waxman, composer, 60
 February 25 – Fats Pichon, jazz pianist, bandleader, 60
 March 6
 Zoltán Kodály, composer, 84
 Nelson Eddy, US singer and actor, 65
 March 7 – Willie Smith, alto saxophonist, 56 (cancer)
 March 10  – Ina Boyle, Irish composer, 78
 March 11 – Geraldine Farrar, operatic soprano, 85
 March 22 – Luigi Piazza, operatic baritone, 82
 March 23 – Pete Johnson, jazz pianist, 62
 March 29 – Cheo Marquetti, singer-songwriter, 57
 April 5 – Mischa Elman, violinist, 76
 April 12 – Buster Bailey, jazz musician, 64
 April 15 – Totò, songwriter, 69
 April 17 – Red Allen, jazz trumpeter, 59
 April 20 – Anna Fitziu, operatic soprano, 80
 April 29 – J. B. Lenoir, blues musician, 38 (heart attack)
 April 30 – Jef Le Penven, composer, 47
 May 9 – Philippa Schuyler, pianist and child prodigy
 May 10 – Arthur Carron, operatic tenor, 66
 May 17 – John Wesley Work III, composer, 65
 May 21 – Ilona Eibenschütz, pianist, 95
 Barsegh Kanachyan, composer of the Armenian national anthem, 82
 May 31 – Billy Strayhorn, composer and pianist, 51 (esophageal cancer)
 June 3 – André Cluytens, conductor, 62
 June 24
 Lionel Belasco, pianist and bandleader, about 85
 Kai Normann Andersen, composer, 67
 June 26 – Françoise Dorléac, actress and singer, 25 (car accident)
 June 29 – Jayne Mansfield, actress, violinist and sometime singer, 34 (car accident)
 July 17 – John Coltrane, jazz musician, 40 (liver cancer)
 July 26 – Matthijs Vermeulen, composer, 79
 July 30 – Marios Varvoglis, composer, 81
 August 4 – Gustave Samazeuilh, composer, editor and critic, 90
 Nino Marcelli, conductor and composer, 77
 August 5 – Evelyn Scotney, coloratura soprano, 71
 August 8 – Jaromír Weinberger, composer, 71
 August 27 – Brian Epstein, manager of The Beatles, 32
 September 15 – Hans Haug, primitivist composer, 67
 September 17 – Stanley R. Avery, composer, 87
 September 25 – Stuff Smith, jazz violinist, 58
 October 3
 Woody Guthrie singer, songwriter, 55 (Huntington's Disease)
 Sir Malcolm Sargent, conductor, 72
 November 8 – Keg Johnson, jazz trombonist, 58
 November 10 – Ida Cox, blues singer, 71
 November 13 – Harriet Cohen, pianist, 71
 November 16 – Roshan, Bollywood composer, 50 (heart attack)
 November 22 – Edvin Kallstenius, composer, 86
 November 23 – Otto Erich Deutsch, musicologist, 84
 November 24 – Raúl Borges, guitarist and composer, 85
 November 25 – Dawid Engela, broadcaster, composer and musicologist, 36 (road accident)
 November 30 – Heinz Tietjen, conductor, 86
 December 4 – Bert Lahr, vaudeville performer, 72
 December 6 – Lillian Evanti, operatic soprano, 77
 December 10 (in plane crash):
 Otis Redding, soul singer, 26
 Four of six members of soul group The Bar-Kays:
 Ronnie Caldwell, 18
 Phalon Jones, 18
 Jimmy King, 18
 Carl Cunningham, 18
 December 11 – Victor de Sabata, conductor and composer, 75
 December 19 – Carmen Melis, operatic soprano, 82
 December 28 – Maria Nemeth, operatic soprano, 70
 December 29 – Paul Whiteman, bandleader, 77
 December 30 – Roger Penzabene, Motown songwriter, 23 (suicide)
 date unknown
 Texas Gladden, folk singer
 Knud Harder, composer

Awards

Grammy Awards
 Grammy Awards of 1967

Eurovision Song Contest
 Eurovision Song Contest 1967

Other
 Sangeet Natak Akademi Award for Hindustani music – Amir Khan

See also
Hot 100 No. 1 Hits of 1967

References

 
20th century in music
Music by year